Dharmajuddha is an upcoming Indian Bengali-language political drama film directed by Raj Chakraborty. The film is jointly produced by Raj Chakraborty and Shyam Agarwal under their banners of Raj Chakraborty Entertainment and Srijan Arts respectively. The film is set at the backdrop of a communal riot between Hindus and Muslims. The film stars Swatilekha Sengupta, Ritwick Chakraborty, Subhashree Ganguly, Soham Chakraborty and Parno Mittra in lead roles.

Plot
The plot revolves around a sudden break out of a communal roit in the small town of Ismailpur. Four persons, communal rival to each other namely Munni, Raghav, Shabnam and Jabbar take shelter at an old woman, Ammi's house. Then a series of events occur in their lives at that night.

Cast
 Swatilekha Sengupta as Ammi 
 Ritwick Chakraborty as Raghav 
 Subhashree Ganguly as Munni 
 Soham Chakraborty as Jabbar 
 Parno Mittra as Shabnam 
 Koushik Roy as Narayan, Shabnam's lover
 Saptarshi Maulik as Ratan, Munni's husband

Release
The teaser of the film was released on 6 December 2019. The trailer of the film was unveiled on 14 February, 2020. The film is scheduled to release theatrically on 11 August, 2022.

Soundtrack

All the songs are composed by Indraadip Dasgupta. All the lyrics are penned by Ritam Sen.

References

External links
 

2022 thriller drama films
Bengali-language Indian films
Indian thriller drama films
Indian political drama films
Films directed by Raj Chakraborty
Upcoming Bengali-language films
Films postponed due to the COVID-19 pandemic